José-Maria de Heredia (22 November 1842 – 3 October 1905) was a Cuban-born French Parnassian poet. He was the fifteenth member elected for seat 4 of the Académie française in 1894.

Biography

Early years
Heredia was born at Fortuna Cafeyere, near Santiago de Cuba,  to Domingo de Heredia Mieses Pimentel Guridi native of Santo Domingo and his second wife, French Louise Girard d'Houville. At the age of eight he went from the West Indies to France, returning then to Havana at age seventeen, and finally making France his home not long afterwards. He received his classical education with the priests of Saint Vincent at Senlis, and after his visit to Havana he studied at the Ecole des Chartes at Paris. During the later 1860s, with François Edouard Joachim Coppée, René François Armand Sully-Prudhomme, Paul Verlaine and others less distinguished, he was one of the  poets who associated with Charles Leconte de Lisle, and were given the name of "Parnassiens".

Career
To this new school, form – the technical part of their art – was of supreme importance, and, as a reaction against the influence of Alfred de Musset, they repressed in their work the expression of personal feeling and emotion. "True poetry," said M. de Heredia in his discourse on entering the Academy, "dwells in nature and in humanity, which are eternal, and not in the heart of the creature of a day, however great." De Heredia wrote very little, and published even less, but his sonnets were circulated in manuscript form, and gave him a reputation before they were published in 1893, together with a few longer poems, as a volume, with the title Les Trophées. In the original work, he called to his great friend, the artist Ernest Jean-Marie Millard de Bois Durand, to illustrate his book of original watercolors.

He was granted French nationality in 1893 and was subsequently elected to the Académie française on 22 February 1894, in the place of Charles de Mazade the publicist. Few purely literary men can have entered the Academy with so few credentials. A small volume of verse; a translation, with introduction, of Diaz del Castillo's History of the Conquest of New Spain (1878–1881); a translation of the life of the nun Alferez (1894), Thomas de Quincey's "Spanish Military Nun"; one or two short pieces of occasional verse; and an introduction or so – this is but small literary output. But the sonnets are of their kind among the most skilled of modern literature. "A Légende des siècles in sonnets" M. François Coppée termed them. In 1901 de Heredia became librarian of the Bibliothèque de l'Arsenal at Paris. He died at the Château de Bourdonné in Seine-et-Oise on 3 October 1905, having completed his critical edition of André Chénier's works.

See also

 José María Heredia y Campuzano Cuban poet
 Severiano de Heredia Cuban-born politician naturalized as French

References

External links
 
  
 

1842 births
1905 deaths
People from Santiago de Cuba Province
Cuban people of Dominican Republic descent
French people of Cuban descent
19th-century French poets
Symbolist poets
Members of the Académie Française
Officiers of the Légion d'honneur
École Nationale des Chartes alumni
Cuban emigrants to France
Cuban people of French descent
Cuban male writers
French male poets
French-language writers
Members of the Ligue de la patrie française
19th-century French male writers
English–Spanish translators
French–Spanish translators
Latin–Spanish translators
Spanish–French translators
Sonneteers